The 2019–20 season was the 134th in the history of Luton Town Football Club, a professional association football club based in Luton, Bedfordshire, England. Their promotion from League One in 2018–19 meant it was the club's first season in the Championship after a 12-year absence and 94th season in the English Football League. The season ran from 1 July 2019 to the end of the 2019–20 Championship season.

Background and pre-season

Competitions

EFL Championship

League table

FA Cup

EFL Cup

Transfers

In

 Brackets around club names indicate the player's contract with that club had expired before he joined Luton.

Out

 Brackets around club names indicate the player joined that club after his Luton contract expired.

Loan in

Loan out

Appearances and goals
Source:
Numbers in parentheses denote appearances as substitute.
Players with names struck through and marked  left the club during the playing season.
Players with names in italics and marked * were on loan from another club for the whole of their season with Luton.
Players listed with no appearances have been in the matchday squad but only as unused substitutes.
Key to positions: GK – Goalkeeper; DF – Defender; MF – Midfielder; FW – Forward

References

External links

Luton Town F.C. seasons
Luton Town